This is a list of Nigerian films released in 1997.

Films

See also 

 List of Nigerian films

References

External links 

 1997 films at the Internet Movie Database

1997
Lists of 1997 films by country or language
1997 in Nigeria
1990s in Nigerian cinema